Dovid Kaplan is an Orthodox Jewish rabbi, kiruv educator, author, and speaker. He is known for his inspirational and humorous storytelling both in his international speaking engagements and in his Impact! series of books.

Early life and education
Dovid Kaplan was born in Chicago. He is the grandson of Rabbi Hertzl Kaplan and great-nephew of Rabbi Mendel Kaplan, rosh yeshivas at the Hebrew Theological College in Skokie, Illinois. Kaplan graduated from Fasman Yeshiva High School (the Skokie Yeshiva) in 1976, and attended Northeastern Illinois University. He received rabbinical ordination in Israel.

Career
Kaplan initially embarked on a business career as co-owner of a kosher restaurant in the Chicago area. In 1987 he switched tracks and became a teacher of Talmud at Ohr Somayach, Jerusalem, where he currently serves as senior lecturer. He is also a mashgiach ruchani at Yeshivas Bais Yisroel in Neve Yaakov, Jerusalem.

Kaplan launched his writing career with a 64-page "guidebook" for entry-level Talmud students titled The Ohr Somayach Gemara Companion (2000). In 2003 he compiled a humorous collection of short stories from his work with baalei teshuva at Ohr Somayach titled The Kiruv Files. Kaplan saw the book as a tool for baalei teshuva to know "what they should do and, more importantly, what they shouldn't do".

Kaplan began writing a parenting column for Hamodia magazine in the 2000s and collected many of his popular columns into the books Polishing Diamonds: Bringing out the sparkle in our children (2005) and Perfecting Diamonds: Bringing out the sparkle in our children (2008). Since 2006, he has published six titles in the Impact! series of inspirational short stories. Twenty-six of his stories were adapted for children in the 2009 book Impact! for Kids by Leah Subar. He is also active as an international lecturer on Jewish education, parenting, and other subjects. In a 2011 interview, he said he had "about 2,500 stories on file" to use in speeches.

Personal
Kaplan and his wife, Tammy, and their family reside in the Neve Yaakov neighborhood of Jerusalem. He is a Kohen.

Bibliography

References

External links
Free audio downloads by Rabbi Dovid Kaplan
Excerpt from The Kiruv Files 

Rabbis of Ohr Somayach
Haredi rabbis in Israel
Orthodox Jewish outreach
21st-century rabbis in Jerusalem
Writers from Chicago
Year of birth missing (living people)
Living people